Nowa Huta  (Cashubian Nowô Hëta) is a village in the administrative district of Gmina Kartuzy, within Kartuzy County, Pomeranian Voivodeship, in northern Poland.

For details of the history of the region, see History of Pomerania.

The village has a population of 282.

Notable residents

Gerard Labuda (born 1916), historian

References

Nowa Huta